Chrysallida subtantilla is a species of sea snail, a marine gastropod mollusk in the family Pyramidellidae, the pyrams and their allies. The species is one of a number within the genus Chrysallida.

Distribution
This species occurs in the following locations:

 Russian waters
 Laptev Sea

Habitat
This species is found in the following habitats:
 Brackish
 Marine

References

External links
 To World Register of Marine Species

subtantilla
Gastropods described in 1967